Andreas Wolff (born 3 March 1991) is a German handball player for Industria Kielce and the German national team.

Achievements
DHB-Pokal:
: 2017, 2019
EHF Cup:
: 2019
Summer Olympics:
: 2016
European Championship:
: 2016

Individual awards
 All-Star Goalkeeper of the European Championship: 2016
 All-Star Goalkeeper of the World Championship: 2023

References

External links

1991 births
Living people
German male handball players
HSG Wetzlar players
THW Kiel players
Vive Kielce players
Expatriate handball players in Poland
German expatriate sportspeople in Poland
People from Euskirchen
Sportspeople from Cologne (region)
Handball-Bundesliga players
Olympic handball players of Germany
Handball players at the 2016 Summer Olympics
Medalists at the 2016 Summer Olympics
Olympic bronze medalists for Germany
Olympic medalists in handball
Handball players at the 2020 Summer Olympics